Hazel Jagonoy (born 1988) is an international Philippines lawn bowler.

Biography
She won a triples gold at the Asia Pacific Bowls Championships in Christchurch but came to prominence after winning a bronze medal at the 2016 World Outdoor Bowls Championship in Christchurch in the fours with Rosita Bradborn, Ronalyn Greenlees and Sonia Bruce.

In 2020 she was selected for the 2020 World Outdoor Bowls Championship in Australia.

References

1988 births
Filipino female lawn bowls players
Living people
Sportspeople from Northern Samar
Southeast Asian Games medalists in lawn bowls
Southeast Asian Games silver medalists for the Philippines
Competitors at the 2007 Southeast Asian Games
Competitors at the 2017 Southeast Asian Games
Competitors at the 2019 Southeast Asian Games
Southeast Asian Games bronze medalists for the Philippines